The men's discus throw was a track and field athletics event held as part of the Athletics at the 1904 Summer Olympics programme. It was the third time the event was held. The competition was held on Saturday, September 3, 1904. Six athletes from two nations competed.

Sheridan and Rose tied for the lead, both throwing 39.28 metres to jointly set a new Olympic record. A throw-off determined the eventual champion. Sheridan won, becoming the second American champion in the men's discus throw after Robert Garrett in 1896. Nikolaos Georgantas of Greece took bronze, the nation's first medal since 1896.

Background

This was the third appearance of the event, which is one of 12 athletics events to have been held at every Summer Olympics. The only returning competitor from 1900 was seventh-place finisher John Flanagan of the United States. Martin Sheridan (1904 AAU champion) and Ralph Rose (the 1904 Olympic shot put champion) of the United States and Nikolaos Georgantas were favorites among the small field.

No nations made their debut in the men's discus throw. Both of the nations competing in 1904, Greece and the United States, had also previously competed in both 1896 and 1900.

Competition format

The format of the competition is unclear; it appears that each there was a single round of throwing with each thrower receiving six attempts. There was no provision at the time for breaking ties based on the second-best throw, so the tie for first place was broken with a three-throw throw-off.

Records

These were the standing world and Olympic records (in metres) prior to the 1904 Summer Olympics.

* unofficial

The top four men all beat the Olympic record. At first Ralph Rose set a new Olympic record with 39.28 metres, later Martin Sheridan equalized his record.

Schedule

Results

References

Sources
 

Athletics at the 1904 Summer Olympics
Discus throw at the Olympics